Saam Daam Dand Bhed is an Indian political drama series that aired on Star Bharat. It is produced by Shakuntalam Telefilms. The show went on air on 28 August 2017.

Plot
The story revolves around Vijay Namdhari and his political journey, where the lust for power tests the bonds of love, family and friendship.

Cast

Main
Bhanu Uday as Vijay Namdhari, Anant's best friend, Bulbul's husband and Mandira's love interest
Varun Toorkey as Anant Singh Baghel, Vijay's best friend, Mandira's husband and King of Kaushalpur
Sonal Vengurlekar as Mandira Singh Rajput, CM's daughter, Anant's wife
Aishwarya Khare as Bulbul Namdhari, Vijay's wife and love interest

Recurring
Perneet Chauhan as Tejaswini Singh Baghel, Anant's elder sister
Gireesh Sahedev as Pankaj Chaudhary, Vijay's rival, CM's cousin and Mandira's uncle
Shashank Vatsya as Rambodh
Aishwarya Raj Bhakuni as Ragini, as Pankaj Chaudhary's kidnapee
Aalok Kapoor as Raghavji, a manipulator politician
Pradeep Shukla as Raguvansh Singh Rajput, aka Baba (Chief Minister aka CM)
Akshay Anand as Prabhat Namdhari, Vijay's elder brother
Eva Ahuja as Sadhna Namdhari, Prabhat's wife
Aakarshan Singh as Agastya Namdhari, Vijay's younger brother
Niel Satpuda as Angad Namdhari, Vijay's Nephew, Prabhat and Sadhna's son
Afia Tayebali as Vasundra Namdhari, Vijay's Niece, Prabhat and Sadhna's daughter
Adish Vaidya/Devesh Sharma as Yug, Vasu's husband
Abhishek Singh Rajput as Girl's hostel guy

References

2017 Indian television series debuts
Hindi-language television shows
Indian drama television series
Star Bharat original programming
2018 Indian television series endings
Indian political television series